Jome mosque is related to the Seljuq dynasty and is located in Ardabil Province, Ardabil.

References

Mosques in Ardabil Province
Mosque buildings with domes
National works of Iran
Ardabil
Seljuk architecture